T-Vice is a Haitian compas band currently based in Miami, Florida. The group has performed throughout the world, most notably in cities of Miami, New York City, Chicago, Toronto, Paris and throughout the Caribbean through various concerts, carnivals, and festivals.

History
Roberto and Reynaldo Martino, the sons of renowned Haitian lead guitarist Robert Martino of the classic compas band, Top Vice, were musically inspired by them to create music of their own. In 1992, T-Vice was founded as a successor to Top Vice, in which the T- is shortened twice, once from Ti', then ultimately from the word petit, which is French (as well as Creole) for "small" (hence "Small" Vice). They soon recruited longtime friends James Cardozo and Gérald Kébreau completing the original quartet and are still known as such today.

T-Vice band is based in Miami, Fl. It was formed in 1991. Musical influences include reggae, merengue, flamenco and rock n’ roll. Unlike most Haitian bands, T-Vice's reach extends outside of Haiti to as far as the US, Caribbean and even Europe. T-Vice collaborates with other popular Haitian bands, most notably,their former rival Michel Martelly (Sweet Micky) Carimi and even their rival band Djakout Mizik. They have also worked with the famous Haitian rapper Wyclef Jean and Jamaican musician Buju Banton.

Members 
Current
Roberto Martino – lead vocals, guitar and composer (1992–)
Reynaldo Martino – vocals, keyboard, and composer (1992–)
Gérald Kébreau – bass (1999–2014)
Antoine Felder- bass (2014-2020)
James Cardozo – vocals, keytar (1992–)
Olivier Duret – second lead vocals (2005-2013)
Leovins Mathurin  – drums (2021-)
Eddy Junior Viau (Ti Eddy) – percussion(2006-2014;2016-)
Ricot Amazan (Ti Tambou) – drums (2014-)
Wesner Charles (Ti Wesner) (2008-2013)
Rivenson Louissant ; - Drums (2005-2013)
Marvens Bastien;- drums (2014-2020)
Manager(s):
Jessie Al-Khal – manager (1992–)

References

External links

Haitian musical groups
Musical groups established in 1992